The Douglas XB-42 Mixmaster was an experimental bomber aircraft, designed for a high top speed. The unconventional approach was to mount the two engines within the fuselage driving a pair of contra-rotating propellers mounted at the tail in a pusher configuration, leaving the wing and fuselage clean and free of drag-inducing protrusions.

Two prototype aircraft were built, but the end of World War II changed priorities and the advent of the jet engine gave an alternative way toward achieving high speed.

Design and development
The XB-42 was developed initially as a private venture; an unsolicited proposal was presented to the United States Army Air Forces in May 1943. This resulted in an Air Force contract for two prototypes and one static test airframe, the USAAF seeing an intriguing possibility of finding a bomber capable of the Boeing B-29 Superfortress's range without its size or cost.

The aircraft mounted a pair of Allison V-1710-125 liquid-cooled V-12 engines behind the crew's cabin, each driving one of the twin propellers. Air intakes were in the wing leading edge. The landing gear was tricycle and a full, four surface cruciform tail was fitted, whose ventral fin/rudder unit prevented the coaxial propellers from striking the ground. The pilot and co-pilot sat under twin bubble canopies, and the bombardier sat in the extreme front behind a plexiglass nose.

Defensive armament consisted of two 0.50 in (12.7 mm) machine guns each side in the trailing edge of the wing, which retracted into the wing when not in use. These guns were aimed by the copilot through a sighting station at the rear of his cockpit. The guns had a limited field of fire (25 degrees left right and +20 -15 in elevation) to the rear, but with the aircraft's high speed it was thought unlikely that intercepting fighters would attack from any other angle.

Two more guns were fitted to fire directly forward. Initially ordered as an attack aircraft (XA-42) in the summer of 1943, this variant would have been armed with 16 machine guns or a 75 mm (2.95 in) cannon and two machine guns.

Operational history

The first XB-42 (43-50224) was delivered to the USAAF and flew at Palm Springs, California on 6 May 1944. Performance was excellent, being basically as described in the original proposal: as fast as the de Havilland Mosquito B.XVI but with defensive armament and twice the bombload over short distances. The twin bubble canopies proved a bad idea as communications were adversely affected and a single bubble canopy was substituted after the first flight of the second prototype.

Testing revealed that the XB-42 suffered from some instability as excessive yaw was encountered, as well as propeller vibration and poor engine cooling - all problems that could probably have been dealt with. Due to the ventral vertical stabilizer and rudder surface set's tip being located underneath the fuselage, careful handling during taxiing, takeoff, and landing was required because of limited ground clearance.

The end of World War II allowed the Air Force to consider possibilities with a little more leisure and it was decided to wait for the development of better jet bombers rather than continue with the B-42 program.

In December 1945, Captain Glen Edwards and Lt. Col. Henry E. Warden set a new transcontinental speed record when they flew the second prototype XB-42 (43-50225) from Long Beach, California to Bolling Air Force Base in Washington, D.C. (c. 2,300 miles). In just 5 hours, 17 minutes, the XB-42 set a speed record of 433.6 mph (697.8 km/h).

The record-breaking XB-42 prototype was destroyed in a crash on 16 December. On a routine flight out of Bolling Field, Washington, D.C., suffered in short order, a landing gear extension problem, failure of the left engine, and as coolant temperatures rose, failure of the right engine. Major Hayduck bailed out at 1,200 feet, Lt. Col. Haney at 800 feet, and the pilot Lt. Col. Fred J. Ascani, after crawling aft to jettison the pusher propellers, at 400 feet – all three survived. The aircraft crashed at Oxon Hill, Maryland. The classified jettisonable propeller technology caused a problem for authorities in explaining what witnesses on the ground thought was the aircraft exploding. Possible fuel management problems were speculated, but this hypothesis was never proven by subsequent investigation. 

The remaining prototype was used in flight test programs, including fulfilling a December 1943 proposal by Douglas to fit uprated engines and underwing Westinghouse 19XB-2A axial-flow turbojets of 1,600 lbf (7.1 kN) thrust each, making it the XB-42A.

In this configuration, it first flew at Muroc (now Edwards Air Force Base) on 27 May 1947. In testing, it reached 488 mph (785 km/h). After 22 flights, the lower vertical stabilizer and rudder were damaged in a hard landing in 1947. The XB-42A was repaired but never flew again, and was taken off the USAF inventory on 30 June 1949.

Surviving aircraft
The first prototype 43-50224 - in storage awaiting restoration in the Restoration Hangar at the National Museum of the United States Air Force in Dayton, Ohio. The prototype was removed from the USAF inventory in 1949 and given to the National Air and Space Museum in Washington, D.C., in whose care it remains although it has never been placed on display. The wings were removed for transport but have since been lost. In late 2010, the fuselage was transferred, along with the Douglas XB-43 Jetmaster, to the National Museum of the United States Air Force in Dayton, Ohio where they are awaiting restoration in the Restoration Hangars. Once completed, they will be displayed in the Museum's Experimental Aircraft Hangar.

Specifications (XB-42)

See also

References

Citation

Bibliography

 O'Leary, Michael, ed. "Elegant Failure." America's Forgotten Wings, Volume 1, 1994, pp. 4–11.

External links

 XB-42A
 "Christmas Brings Joy To Everyone, 1945/12/10," Universal Newsreel,1945

B-42 Mixmaster
Douglas B-42 Mixmaster
Cancelled military aircraft projects of the United States
Twin-engined single-prop pusher aircraft
Mid-engined aircraft
Aircraft with contra-rotating propellers
Mid-wing aircraft
Aircraft first flown in 1944
Aircraft with auxiliary jet engines